Think This is the second studio album by the American thrash metal band Toxik, released on October 13, 1989 by Roadracer Records. It is their only studio album to feature vocalist Charles Sabin and guitarist John Donnelly, and the last one to feature bassist Brian Bonini and drummer Tad Leger. Think This would also be Toxik's last studio album before their initial breakup in 1992, resulting in a 33-year gap between records until the release of Dis Morta in 2022. The album was re-released by Metal Mind Productions and Displeased Records in 2007. Its artwork was designed by Ed Repka.

Reception 
In 2005, Think This was ranked number 409 in Rock Hard magazine's book The 500 Greatest Rock & Metal Albums of All Time.

Track listing

Personnel 
Charles Sabin – vocals
Josh Christian – guitars
John Donnelly – guitars
Brian Bonini – bass
Tad Leger – drums

References 

1989 albums
Roadrunner Records albums
Toxik albums
Albums with cover art by Ed Repka